Now That's What I Call the 80s is a special edition of the (UK) Now! series, released on October 29, 2007. The three-CD set has 60 hits from the 1980s.

Track listing

CD 1
Elton John - "I'm Still Standing" (1983)
A-Ha - "Take On Me" (1985)
David Bowie & Mick Jagger - "Dancing in the Street" (1986)
Nik Kershaw - "I Won't Let the Sun Go Down on Me" (1983)
Philip Oakey & Giorgio Moroder - "Together in Electric Dreams" (1982)
Duran Duran - "A View to a Kill" (1985)
Spandau Ballet - "Gold" (1982)
Matthew Wilder - "Break My Stride" (1983)
DeBarge - "Rhythm of the Night" (1985)
Simply Red - "Money's Too Tight (To Mention)" (1987)
Simple Minds - "Don't You Forget About Me" (1985)
The Cure - "Lovesong" (1989)
The Go-Gos - "Vacation" (1982)
Genesis - "Mama" (1983)
Paul McCartney - "No More Lonely Nights" (1983)
Cyndi Lauper - "Time After Time" (1983)
Yazoo - "Only You" (1983)
Peter Gabriel & Kate Bush - "Don't Give Up" (1982)
Phil Collins - "In the Air Tonight" (1981)

CD 2
The Proclaimers - "I'm Gonna Be (500 Miles)" (1989/1993)
The Bangles - "Walk Like an Egyptian" (1987)
Run-DMC feat. Aerosmith - "Walk This Way" (1985)
Billy Idol - "Rebel Yell" (1983)
Katrina & The Waves - "Walking on Sunshine" (1986)
Corey Hart - "Sunglasses At Night" (1984)
Fine Young Cannibals - "Good Thing" (1989)
George Michael - "Faith" (1987)
Womack & Womack - "Teardrops" (1986)
Lionel Richie - "Dancing on the Ceiling" (1985)
The Communards - "Don't Leave Me This Way" (1986)
Erasure - "A Little Respect" (1987)
Climie Fisher - "Love Changes (Everything)" (1987)
Johnny Hates Jazz - "Shattered Dreams" (1987)
Level 42 - "Lessons in Love" (1986)
Bobby Brown - "My Prerogative" (1988)
Cameo - "Word Up!" (1981)
Whitney Houston - "How Will I Know" (1986)
Soul II Soul feat. Caron Wheeler - "Keep on Movin'" (1989)
Neneh Cherry - "Buffalo Stance" (1988)
UB40 - "Red Red Wine" (1982)

CD 3
Wet Wet Wet - "Angel Eyes (Home and Away)" (1989)
Heart - "Alone" (1987)
Tears for Fears - "Everybody Wants to Rule the World" (1985)
Huey Lewis and the News - "The Power of Love" (1985)
Kiss - "Crazy Crazy Nights" (1987)
Whitesnake - "Here I Go Again '87" (1987)
Tina Turner - "The Best" (1989)
Robert Palmer - "Addicted to Love" (1986)
David Bowie - "Modern Love" (1983)
Starship - "We Built This City" (1985)
Danny Wilson - "Mary's Prayer" (1987)
Wham! - "Wake Me Up Before You Go-Go" (1985)
Cyndi Lauper - "Girls Just Want to Have Fun" (1984)
Kate Bush - "Running Up that Hill" (1983)
Simple Minds - "Alive and Kicking" (1986)
Steve Winwood - "Higher Love" (1986)
Swing Out Sister - "Breakout" (1986)
Robbie Nevil - "C'est La Vie" (1986)
Squeeze - "Tempted" (1981)
Harold Faltermeyer - "Axel F" (1984)

See also 
 Now That's What I Call the 80s (U.S. series)

External links
 Now That's What I Call the 80s front- and backcover
 Now That's What I Call the 80s Track List

2007 compilation albums
EMI Records compilation albums
Virgin Records compilation albums
Universal Music Group compilation albums
1980s